Belionota sumptuosa, commonly known as the Tricolor Metallic Wood-boring Beetle, is a jewel beetle of the Buprestidae family. It is found in Indonesia.

Description
Like many jewel beetles, the species is notable for its vivid, iridescent coloration.

References

 Universal Biological Indexer
 Encyclopedia of Life

External links
 Belionota sumptuosa at ono.com

Beetles of Asia
Buprestidae
Insects of Indonesia
Woodboring beetles
Beetles described in 1838